Corinna Harrer (born 19 January 1991) is a German middle distance runner. She was born in Regensburg. At the 2012 Summer Olympics, she competed in the 1500 metres. She won a silver medal at the 2013 European Athletics Indoor Championships in the 3000 metres.

References

External links 
 
 
 

1991 births
Living people
Sportspeople from Regensburg
German female middle-distance runners
German national athletics champions
Olympic athletes of Germany
Athletes (track and field) at the 2012 Summer Olympics
21st-century German women